Fawkner may refer to:

In geography: 
 Division of Fawkner, Australian electoral division in Victoria, named after John Pascoe Fawkner
 Fawkner, Victoria, a suburb of Melbourne, Australia, named after John Pascoe Fawkner
 Fawkner railway station
 Fawkner Crematorium and Memorial Park
 Fawkner Secondary College, a public secondary school 
 Fawkner Park, Melbourne, Australian recreational area, named after John Pascoe Fawkner
 Fawkner Secondary College, a public secondary school in Fawkner, Victoria, Australia

In people: 
 John Pascoe Fawkner (1792-1869), Australian pioneer and politician
 Steve Fawkner, software programmer
 Jonathan Fawkner, visual effects artist

In sports: 
 Fawkner Blues, Australian football (soccer) club from Fawkner, Victoria
 Fawkner-Whittlesea Blues, Australian football (soccer) club from Epping, Victoria

See also 
 Falconer (disambiguation)
 Falkner (disambiguation)
 Faulkner (disambiguation)
 Faulknor (disambiguation)
Faulconer (disambiguation)